Steven Edward Wilshaw (born 11 January 1959) is an English former professional footballer who played in the Football League for Crewe Alexandra.

Career
Wilshaw was born in Stoke-on-Trent and began his career with Stoke City. He failed to break into the first team at Stoke and joined Fourth Division side Crewe Alexandra in 1978 where he spent one season making 28 appearances before playing non-league football with Northwich Victoria and then Telford United.

Career statistics
Source:

References

1959 births
Living people
English footballers
Association football midfielders
English Football League players
Stoke City F.C. players
Crewe Alexandra F.C. players
Northwich Victoria F.C. players
Telford United F.C. players